Pbunavirus (synonyms: Pb1likevirus, Pbunalikevirus) is a genus of viruses in the order Caudovirales, in the family Myoviridae. Bacteria serve as natural hosts. There are 27 species in this genus.

Taxonomy
The following species are recognized:

 Pseudomonas virus 14-1
 Pseudomonas virus Ab28
 Pseudomonas virus BrSP1
 Pseudomonas virus DL60
 Pseudomonas virus DL68
 Pseudomonas virus DP1
 Pseudomonas virus E215
 Pseudomonas virus E217
 Pseudomonas virus EPa61
 Pseudomonas virus F8
 Pseudomonas virus JG024
 Pseudomonas virus KPP12
 Pseudomonas virus KTN6
 Pseudomonas virus LBL3
 Pseudomonas virus LMA2
 Pseudomonas virus LS1
 Pseudomonas virus NH4
 Pseudomonas virus PA01
 Pseudomonas virus PA5
 Pseudomonas virus PA8P1
 Pseudomonas virus PB1
 Pseudomonas virus PS44
 Pseudomonas virus R12
 Pseudomonas virus R26
 Pseudomonas virus S1
 Pseudomonas virus SL1
 Pseudomonas virus SN

Structure
Pbunaviruses are nonenveloped, with a head and tail. The head has a diameter of about 75  nm. The tail is around 140 nm long displaying a criss-cross pattern, has a small baseplate, and is contractile.

Genome
Genomes are linear, around 65-75kb in length. The genome codes for 90 to 130 proteins. Some species have been fully sequenced and are available from ICTV. They range between 64k and 73k nucleotides, with 88 to 127 proteins. The complete genomes are available from here.

Life cycle
Viral replication is cytoplasmic. The virus attaches to the host cell using its terminal fibers, and ejects the viral DNA into the host cytoplasm via contraction of its tail sheath. DNA-templated transcription is the method of transcription. Once the viral genes have been replicated, the procapsid is assembled and packed. The tail is then assembled and the mature virions are released via lysis. Bacteria serve as the natural host. Transmission routes are passive diffusion.

History
According to the ICTV's 2010–11 report, the genus Pb1likevirus was first accepted as a new genus, at the same time as all of its contained species. This proposal is available here. The following year (2012), the name was changed to Pbunalikevirus. This proposal is available here. The genus was later renamed to Pbunavirus.

References

External links
 Viralzone: Pbunalikevirus
 ICTV

Myoviridae
Virus genera